David John Hanna (4  June 1866 – 12 April 1946) was an American politician. Between 1903 and 1907 he served as Lieutenant Governor of Kansas.

Life
David Hanna was born in Coulterville, Illinois. In his childhood he moved with his parents to Clay County, Kansas where he grew up. Later he was engaged in farming, cattle raising and in the real estate business. In addition he became President of the Farmers and Merchants Bank of Hill City. He joined the Republican Party and in 1896 and 1897 he represented Graham County, Kansas in the Kansas Legislature. He was also a member of the Republican State Central Committee for six years. In 1900 he was a delegate to the Republican National Convention in Philadelphia that nominated President William McKinley for a second term.

In 1902 David Hanna was elected to the office of the Lieutenant Governor of Kansas. After a re-election in 1904 he served two terms in this position between 12 January 1903 and 14 January 1907 when his second term ended. In this function he was the deputy of Governor Willis J. Bailey (first term) and Governor Edward W. Hoch (second term). After the end of his time as Lieutenant Governor Hanna did not occupy any political offices any more. He died on 12 April 1946 in Glendale, California.

External links
 
 The Political Graveyard
 The Lieutenant Governors of Kansas
 Online Biography of Hanna's earlier years

1866 births
1946 deaths
Lieutenant Governors of Kansas
Kansas Republicans
People from Clay County, Kansas
People from Randolph County, Illinois